Anichkovs (Onichkovs) - An ancient Russian noble family.

When submitting documents for entering the genus into the Velvet Book, two petitions were submitted: Ivan Alexandrovich (March 19, 1686) and Alexander Nikiforovich (September 20, 1687), as well as petition Stepan Alexandrovich about sending to Discharge order extracts from the chronicler, kept in the Trinity-Sergius Monastery, about the origin of the Anichkovs, which was done by the authorities of the monastery (May 31, 1688). In one pedigree of the painting submitted by the Anichkovs, homogenous Blokhin and Ufimtsevs are shown.

Over the past three centuries, the family has been closely associated with the city St. Petersburg, giving its name to several urban infrastructure facilities.

Origin and history 
The lineage has been recorded since the 16th century. According to the latter genealogy, a member of the family of the Tatar Berke Khan, ruler of the Golden Horde, became a great friend of Ivan I Kalita - later the Grand Duke of Moscow (1325) - and entered his service in 1301.  Berke's relative was baptised, taking the name Berkey Onikii, and married the daughter of Vikula of the noble house of Vorontsov. From this adopted name, his descendants began to be called Onichkov, or Anichkov. The baptism was performed by Peter, the Metropolitan of Kyiv, who blessed the new Christian with a gold Panagia, decorated with expensive stones and containing relics, and a silver ladle with the inscription: " ... the humble Metropolitan Peter of Kiev and all Rus' bless at his holy baptism the Prince Berkey and his sons with the name of Aniky."  The Grand Duchess, Elena, wife of Ivan Kalita, was Godmother to Berkey and presented him, among other gifts, with a precious gold cross, while the Grand Duke granted him a living stipend. These gifts were kept in the Anichkov family as relics.

The landowners of Derevskaya Pyatina were: Gregory, Vasily, Andrey, Gleb, Ivan Ivanovich Anichkovs (1495). Derevskaya pyatina is one of the pyatina Novgorod Land until the 18th century.
Mikhail and Polievkt Grigorievich were killed near Orsha (1514). Fyodor Denisievich voivode of troops in the campaign of the Grand Duke Vasily III to Kazan (1530). Boyar Ivan Grigorievich guarantor for the boyars (1563), siege head in Salekh (1578-1579), Kholm (1682-1584). Novgorod boyar sons: Bogdan and Semyon Ivanovich Anichkovs were granted estates (2 October 1552). In Battle of Molody Aleksey Dmitrievich died from Serpeisk (July 1572).

The tsar's charter mentions († 1603) Malice Onichkov, whose lands received from his grandfather (1597) were transferred to Ivan Mikhailovich Onichkov.

Branches of the Anichkov family were beneficiaries of mestnichestvo, a system which gave nobles prestigious positions at the royal court, or other government posts, according to set rules of precedence for the aristocratic houses and an individual's seniority. At times disputes would arise regarding the proper place of a noble clan within the hierarchy. In 1643, to prevent a reduction in status in this branch's place in the mestnichestvo, the stryapchy's petition stated that "losses" had resulted through distant relatives who were exiled to Ufa during the reign of Ivan the Terrible. According to him, they were "extremely ossified" in Ufa, subsisting "in extreme poverty" and "must obey the Voivodes (governors) who are worse than those of their homeland". The request was heard, and in the decree was written: "Ufimtsov Onichkovs are not ordered to undergo any loss in position."

In the 16th and 17th centuries, among the Anichkovs there were many stewards, Duma nobles, some of whom became governors of large cities, such as  Kursk, Yaroslavl, Ufa, and Cheboksary. In the 17th century, Voivode O. G. Anichkov founded the city of Kuznetsk (now Novokuznetsk), and F. M. Anichkov served as the Russian ambassador to Sweden.

Description of emblems 
In Armorial of Anisim Titovich Knyazev of 1785, there are two images of a seal with the coat of arms of representatives of the Anichkov family:

 Coat of arms court councillor, trustee of the Imperial Orphanage in 1786 Stepan Silich Anichkov: in shield, which has a round shape and a gold border in a circle, in a silver field, galloping to the right along green grass from the forest, white deer with red (golden) antlers. The shield is crowned with a noble helmet with a hint. A noble crown over the helmet (with a gap) is held by the rebellious lion and unicorn, resting their hind legs on the bent.
 The coat of arms of their homogeneous: in an oval shield with a blue field, a silver deer galloping on green grass to the right. The shield is crowned with a noble crown (without a noble helmet). Shield holders: left - lion, on the right - unicorn. Name missing.

Notes

Literature 
 Аничковы // Энциклопедический словарь Брокгауза и Ефрона : в 86 т. (82 т. и 4 доп.). — Санкт-Петербург, 1890–1907.
 Долгоруков П. В. Российская родословная книга. — Санкт-Петербург: Типография 3 Отд. Собств. Е. И. В. Канцелярии, 1857. — Т. 4. — С. 241.
 Руммель В. В., Голубцов В. В. Родословный сборник русских дворянских фамилий. — Т. 1. — С. 35—56.
  Anichkov N.M.  The Anichkovs. - Three centuries of St. Petersburg. Encyclopedia in 3 vols. T. 2. Book 1 (A-B). - Publishing house Filologich. Faculty of St. Petersburg State University, 2003;
  Anichkov S.V.  At the turn of two eras. - Lenningrad: Lenizdat, 1981;
  Petrov P.N.  History of St. Petersburg. - St. Petersburg: Edition of Glazunov, 1885. P. 614.
 Professors of the Military Medical (Medico-Surgical) Academy / Ed. prof. A. B. Belevitina. - St. Petersburg: Publishing house of VMedA. 2008 .-- S. 175, 329, 481.
 Russian Biographical Encyclopedia "Great Russia". T. 1 / Ed. prof. A. I. Melua. - St. Petersburg: Publishing house "Humanistics", 2009. - P. 395–399.
 N.N. Anichkov / Sarkisov D.S. et al. - M .: Medicine, 1989;
  Shilov D.N., Kuzmin Yu. A.  Members of the State Council of the Russian Empire. 1801–1906. - St. Petersburg: Publishing house "Dmitry Bulavin", 2007. - P. 34–36.
 Jubilee article "N. M. Anichkov" // Niva. - 1894. - No. 3. - P. 73;

Russian noble families